Umesh is an Indian given name.

People
 M. S. Umesh, actor
 Umesh Chandra Banerjee, jurist
 Umesh Chandra Dutta, social reformer
 Umesh Chandra Patra, zoologist
 Umesh Harijan, footballer
 Umesh Kamat, actor
 Umesh Kulkarni (cricketer), cricketer
 Umesh Mehra, film director
 Umesh Parag, hockey player
 Umesh Reddy, serial rapist
 Umesh Shukla, film director
 Umesh Upadhyay, television executive
 Umesh Valjee, cricketer
 Umesh Vazirani, computer scientist
 Umesh Vinayak Kulkarni, Marathi film director
 Umesh Waghmare, material scien
(Umesh Shinde ) Pharmacist
 Umesh Navani, Company Secretary

See also
 

Indian masculine given names